Stilpnaroma is a genus of moths in the subfamily Lymantriinae. The genus was erected by Erich Martin Hering in 1926.

Species
Stilpnaroma coenosa (Joannis, 1913) Eritrea
Stilpnaroma nasisi Collenette, 1960 Kenya
Stilpnaroma venosa Hering, 1926 Malawi
Stilpnaroma vitrina (Mabille, 1878) Madagascar

References

Lymantriinae
Moth genera